Wyman is an unorganized territory in Franklin County, Maine, United States of America. The population was 82 at the 2020 census. It is designated as Township 4 Range 3 of Bingham's Kennebec Purchase (West of the Kennebec River).

Geography
According to the United States Census Bureau, the unorganized territory has a total area of 20.2 square miles (52.2 km2), of which, 20.1 square miles (52.0 km2) of it is land and 0.1 square miles (0.3 km2) of it (0.50%) is water. Wyman is home to the Bigelow Public Reserve Land, which protects  of land around Bigelow Mountain.

Demographics

As of the census of 2000, there were 70 people, 35 households, and 14 families residing in the unorganized territory. The population density was 3.5 people per square mile (1.3/km2). There were 160 housing units at an average density of 8.0/sq mi (3.1/km2). The racial makeup of the unorganized territory was 100.00% White.

There were 35 households, out of which 17.1% had children under the age of 18 living with them, 37.1% were married couples living together, and 60.0% were non-families. 40.0% of all households were made up of individuals, and 8.6% had someone living alone who was 65 years of age or older. The average household size was 2.00 and the average family size was 2.64.

In the unorganized territory, the population was spread out, with 12.9% under the age of 18, 24.3% from 18 to 24, 32.9% from 25 to 44, 20.0% from 45 to 64, and 10.0% who were 65 years of age or older. The median age was 34 years. For every 100 females, there were 125.8 males. For every 100 females age 18 and over, there were 144.0 males.

The median income for a household in the unorganized territory was $26,875, and the median income for a family was $41,250. Males had a median income of $22,250 versus $16,250 for females. The per capita income for the unorganized territory was $19,059. There were no families and 3.2% of the population living below the poverty line, including no under eighteens and none of those over 64.

References

Unorganized territories in Maine
Populated places in Franklin County, Maine